The 2022 Houston Dash season is the team's ninth season as an American professional women's soccer team in the National Women's Soccer League.

The 2022 NWSL season will run from 7 May 2022 to 2 October 2022, following the 2022 NWSL Challenge Cup.

Season
The Dash started the season taking part in the 2022 NWSL Challenge Cup. Houston finished in 4th place in Central Division with 2 wins and 4 losses. On 27 April 2022 the team suspended coach James Clarkson for allegations of discrimination, harassment, and abuse, based on an investigation started by the NWSL and NWSLPA the prior season. The Houston Dash appointed assistant coach Sarah Lowdon as acting head coach. On 15 June 2022, the Dash appointed Amorós as the club's new interim head coach pending visa approval. Amorós would not join the team until 12 July while waiting for his visa. In his first match managing the dash on 16 July, with newly acquired striker Ebony Salmon scoring a hat-trick, the Dash under Amorós defeated the Chicago Red Stars 4–1.

On 24 August 2022, the Dash hired former NWSL player Alex Singer as general manager.

Roster

.

 Struck players are no longer with the team.

Staff

Competitions

2022 NWSL Challenge Cup

Divisional standings

2022 National Women's Soccer League season

Season results

Post Season

Regular-season standings

Results summary

Results by matchday

Transactions

2022 NWSL Expansion Draft 

The 2022 NWSL Expansion Draft was an expansion draft held by the NWSL on December 16, 2021, for two expansion teams, Angel City FC and San Diego Wave FC, to select players from existing teams in the league.

On December 10, 2021, the NWSL released the protected lists from teams participating in the draft.

 Bold indicates players selected in the Expansion Draft
 Blue highlights indicate United States federation players 
 Italics indicate players who are not under contract but whose NWSL playing rights remain with the team

Of the Houston Dash's unprotected player list, San Diego selected Kristie Mewis and Angel City selected Jasmyne Spencer.

2022 NWSL Draft 

Draft picks are not automatically signed to the team roster. The 2022 NWSL Draft was held on December 18, 2021.

Transfers in

Transfers out

Awards and Honors

NWSL Best XI

End-of-season Team awards

See also
 2022 National Women's Soccer League season
 2022 in American soccer

References

External links
 

Houston Dash
Houston Dash
Houston Dash seasons
Houston Dash